Susan Horwitz may refer to:

 Susan B. Horwitz (1955–2014), American computer scientist
 Susan Band Horwitz (born 1937), American biochemist